The 2004–05 Argentine Primera División was the 114th season of top-flight football in Argentina. The season ran from 15 August 2004 to 3 July 2005.

Four teams promoted from Primera B Nacional, they were Instituto de Córdoba, Almagro (2003–04 Primera B Nacional champions and runners-up, respectively), plus Argentinos Juniors and Huracán de Tres Arroyos (which had won the promotion playoff the previous year).

Newell's Old Boys won the Apertura (5th league title) and Vélez Sársfield won the Clausura (6th title) championships, while Huracán de Tres Arroyos and Almagro were relegated.

Torneo Apertura

Final standings

Top scorers

Torneo Clausura

Final standings

Top scorers

Relegation

Relegation table

Promotion playoff

Argentinos Juniors and Huracán remained in Primera División

See also
2004-05 in Argentine football

References

Primera Division 2004-05
Argentine Primera División seasons